Miroslav Haraus (born 1 August 1986) is a Slovak Paralympic skier. He first medaled in 2010, but won his first gold at the 2018 Winter Paralympics.

He won the bronze medal in the men's giant slalom visually impaired event at the 2022 Winter Paralympics held in Beijing, China.

References

External links 
 

1986 births
Living people
Slovak male alpine skiers
Paralympic gold medalists for Slovakia
Paralympic silver medalists for Slovakia
Paralympic bronze medalists for Slovakia
Alpine skiers at the 2006 Winter Paralympics
Alpine skiers at the 2010 Winter Paralympics
Alpine skiers at the 2014 Winter Paralympics
Alpine skiers at the 2018 Winter Paralympics
Alpine skiers at the 2022 Winter Paralympics
Medalists at the 2010 Winter Paralympics
Medalists at the 2014 Winter Paralympics
Medalists at the 2018 Winter Paralympics
Medalists at the 2022 Winter Paralympics
Paralympic medalists in alpine skiing
Paralympic alpine skiers of Slovakia
Sportspeople from Prešov